Argyropouli is an Aromanian (Vlach) village and a community of the Tyrnavos municipality. The 2011 census recorded 1,667 inhabitants in the village and 1,670 inhabitants in the municipal unit. The community of Argyropouli covers an area of 103.063 km2.

Administrative division
The community of Argyropouli consists of two settlements:
Ano Argyropouli (population 1)
Argyropouli (population (1,667)
Votanochori (population 2)

Population
According to the 2011 census, the population of the settlement of Argyropouli was 1,670 people, a decrease of almost 12% compared with the population of the previous census of 2001.

See also
 List of settlements in the Larissa regional unit

References

Populated places in Larissa (regional unit)
Aromanian settlements in Greece
Tyrnavos